Kemil Kumaira  is the airport serving Teófilo Otoni, Brazil. It is named after Kemil Said Kumaira (1940 - 2012), a lawyer and politician. Formerly the facility was named after Juscelino Kubitschek.

History
The airport was opened in 1987.

Airlines and destinations

Access

See also

List of airports in Brazil

References

External links

Airports in Minas Gerais
Airports established in 1987
1987 establishments in Brazil